Kristian Lee Turner is a Grand Prix motorcycle racer from United States.

Career statistics

By season

Races by year

References

External links
 Profile on motogp.com

1992 births
Living people
American motorcycle racers
125cc World Championship riders